Debréte is a village in Borsod-Abaúj-Zemplén County in northeastern Hungary. In 2008 it had a population of 19, in 2021 there were 8 people living there.

Populated places in Borsod-Abaúj-Zemplén County